Maria Beatriz Imperial Saw-Tan (born November 17, 1985), is a Filipino actress with Taiwanese descent. She won the second season of Pinoy Big Brother.

On June 30, 2007 (day 126) after garnering about 1.5 million votes, or 30.29% of the total number of votes, Saw was proclaimed as the Big Winner of Pinoy Big Brother. Her record erased Kim Chiu's record for the most votes earned by a Big Winner. She received a million pesos, and prizes including a house and lot, a kitchen showcase, a new car, a business franchise and an Asian package tour for two.

Personal life
In January 2012, Saw married her longtime boyfriend Rock Tan. She announced on Pinoy Big Brother: Unlimited that she is pregnant with her first child. She is now a mother of two daughters.

Filmography

Television

Movies

References

External links

Twitter

1985 births
Living people
Star Magic
Pinoy Big Brother contestants
Big Brother (franchise) winners
Actresses from Camarines Sur